The Roman arch of Medinaceli (Spanish: Arco Romano de Medinaceli) is a Roman triumphal arch located in Medinaceli, in Castile and León, Spain.  It is constructed in stone using a technique called opus quadratum.
It was declared Bien de Interés Cultural in 1930.

See also 

 List of Roman sites in Spain

References 

Buildings and structures in Medinaceli
Ancient Roman buildings and structures in Spain
Bien de Interés Cultural landmarks in the Province of Soria
Triumphal arches in Spain
Arches and vaults in Spain
Domitian
Buildings and structures completed in the 1st century BC
Monuments and memorials in Castile and León